Donald Paul Bellisario (born August 8, 1935) is an American television producer and screenwriter who created and wrote episodes for the TV series Magnum, P.I. (1980), Tales of the Gold Monkey (1982), Airwolf (1984), Quantum Leap (1989), JAG (1995), and NCIS (2003). He has often included military veterans as characters.

Early life
Bellisario was born in Cokeburg, Pennsylvania, to an Italian-American father, and a Serbian-American mother. He served in the U.S. Marine Corps from 1955 to 1959, and attained the rank of sergeant. According to Bellisario, he encountered—and nearly got into a fight with—Lee Harvey Oswald in 1958 at a supply shed at Marine Air Control Squadron 9 because Oswald was reading Pravda, which offended Bellisario.

Bellisario earned a bachelor's degree in journalism at Pennsylvania State University in 1961.

Bellisario became an advertising copywriter in Lancaster, Pennsylvania, in 1965, and three years later became creative director of the Bloom Agency in Dallas, Texas. After rising to senior vice president after eight years, he then moved to Hollywood to pursue screenwriting and production.

Television career
After working under such television producers as Glen A. Larson and Stephen J. Cannell, Bellisario adopted some of their production techniques, for example, using a small pool of actors for his many productions. He created or co-created the TV series Magnum, P.I., Airwolf, Quantum Leap, JAG, and NCIS. He was a writer and producer on Black Sheep Squadron and the original Battlestar Galactica. He wrote and directed the 1988 feature film Last Rites.

Many of Bellisario's protagonists are current or former members of the United States armed forces. Tom Selleck's character in Magnum, P.I. was a United States Naval Academy graduate, former Naval Intelligence officer and Vietnam veteran; Jan-Michael Vincent's character in Airwolf was a Vietnam veteran; Commander Harmon "Harm" Rabb, Jr., the main character of JAG, was a Naval Academy graduate and former Naval Aviator; and NCISs main character, Leroy Jethro Gibbs, is a retired Marine Corps Gunnery Sergeant and Scout Sniper; Jake Cutter (Stephen Collins) from Tales of the Gold Monkey was a former Flying Tigers pilot; and Albert "Al" Calavicci in Quantum Leap was a former Naval Aviator, Vietnam prisoner of war and rear admiral. Several of his main characters share August 8 as their birthday.

Bellisario received a star on the Hollywood Walk of Fame in 2004, which was shown in a Season 9 JAG episode, "Trojan Horse". In an interview with Sci-Fi Channel in the late 1990s, Bellisario said he was inspired to create Quantum Leap in 1988 after reading a novel about time travel. His service alongside John F. Kennedy's assassin, Lee Harvey Oswald, was the basis for the Quantum Leap fifth season double-length episode "Lee Harvey Oswald" (originally aired September 22, 1992).

Bellisario retired in 2007, after widely reported tension with star Mark Harmon ended with the former's departure from NCIS. Although he retains the title of executive producer, he has not had any real creative or executive involvement with NCIS since then. Bellisario later sued CBS over the creation of NCIS: Los Angeles, arguing his contract with the network entitled him to the first rights to create any NCIS spin off, as well as some share of profits from the new show. The suit was settled before trial in 2011 for an undisclosed amount. Bellisario's production company was named "Belisarius Productions" after the Roman general Belisarius, of which "Bellisario" is an Italian-language variant.

Personal life
Bellisario married Margaret Schaffran in 1956 and they divorced in 1974. They had four children, Joy Bellisario-Jenkins (born c. 1956), David Bellisario (1957–2020) a producer on NCIS: Los Angeles, Leslie Bellisario-Ingham (born c. 1961), and Julie Bellisario-Watson (producer on NCIS).

Bellisario married Lynn Halpern in 1979 and they divorced in 1984. They had a son, Michael Bellisario, born on April 7, 1980. Michael had a recurring role as Midshipman Michael Roberts on JAG and played Charles "Chip" Sterling on NCIS.

He married Deborah Pratt, known for her character in Bellisario's Airwolf, in 1984 and they divorced in 1991. They had two children, Troian (born October 28, 1985) and Nicholas (born August 27, 1991). Troian portrayed Sarah McGee on NCIS, Teresa on Quantum Leap, and Erin on JAG, but has become best known for her 2010–2017 role as Spencer Hastings on Pretty Little Liars, a series her father did not produce.

Bellisario married Vivienne Murray (née Lee), on November 27, 1998. He gained two stepsons from the marriage, Chad and Sean Murray, the latter an actor who plays Timothy McGee on NCIS.

Philanthropy and awards
In 2001, Penn State named Bellisario a Distinguished Alumnus, the highest honor bestowed on a graduate.

In 2006, Bellisario endowed a $1 million Trustee Matching Scholarship in the Penn State College of Communications. He recalled:

On October 27, 2016, he received a Visionary Award at the UCLA Neurosurgery Visionary Ball.

On April 21, 2017, the Pennsylvania State University Board of Trustees voted to rename the College of Communications the Donald P. Bellisario College of Communications in recognition of a $30 million endowment from Bellisario. The donation is one of the largest gifts in Penn State history.

Filmography

References

Further reading
  About Donald P. Bellisario.

External links
 
 
 

1935 births
American writers of Italian descent
American people of Serbian descent
American male screenwriters
American television directors
Television producers from Pennsylvania
American television writers
Edgar Award winners
Living people
Donald P. Bellisario College of Communications alumni
People from Washington County, Pennsylvania
Military personnel from Pennsylvania
United States Marines
American male television writers
Film directors from Pennsylvania
Screenwriters from Pennsylvania
Bellisario family